Eightmile Creek or Eight Mile Creek may refer to:

in Australia

 Eight Mile Creek, Queensland, a rural locality in the Shire of Burdekin

 Eight Mile Creek (South Australia), a watercourse in the south east of South Australia
Eight Mile Creek, South Australia, a locality in the local government area of the District Council of Grant

in the United States
Eightmile Creek (Georgia), a stream in Georgia
Eight Mile Creek (Kansas), a stream in Kansas spanned by the Bucher Bridge
Eightmile Creek (Minnesota River), a stream in Minnesota
Eightmile Creek (Missouri), a stream in Missouri
Eightmile Creek (Tenmile Creek), a stream in New York
Eightmile Creek (Fifteenmile Creek), a stream in Oregon
Eightmile Creek (Washington), a stream in the Alpine Lakes Wilderness

See also
 Eightmile (disambiguation)
 Eightmile River, a stream in Connecticut